Erica Kundidzora Azim is a musician based in Berkeley, California, who is associated with a not-for-profit organisation.

Recordings
Mbira - Healing Music of Zimbabwe
	The Relaxation Company CD, 2000

Mbira Dreams
	The Relaxation Company CD 3261 and cassette, 1996

"Nyama musango" on Belief: A Collection of World Sacred Music
	Beliefnet CD 1001, 2000

"Mwanangu" on Mama’s Lullaby and Mother Earth Lullaby
	Ellipsis Arts CDs 4291 and 4293, March 2001 and 2002

"Nyama musango" (background for Peter Matthiesen reading from "Sand Rivers")
on The Naturalists
	Audio Literature, 1997

with Forward Kwenda: Forward Kwenda - Svikiro: Meditations of an Mbira Master
	Shanachie CD 64095, 1997 (extensive liner notes by Erica Azim)

References

External links
Mbira.org This site also includes a biography page for Azim

Living people
Year of birth missing (living people)
American ethnomusicologists